Darryl Bäly (born 19 January 1998) is a professional footballer who plays Derde Divisie club OFC Oostzaan. Born in the Netherlands, he represents the Aruba national team.

Club career
He made his Eerste Divisie debut for Volendam on 24 August 2018 in a game against Sparta Rotterdam, as a starter.

In the 2019–20 season, Bäly was not a part of the plans of head coach Wim Jonk and he mainly played with the reserve team Jong Volendam in the Tweede Divisie. On 31 January 2020 he was sent on loan to Telstar for the remainder of the season.

In May 2021, Bäly signed with Derde Divisie club OFC Oostzaan after his contract with Volendam was not extended.

International
Bäly made his Aruba national football team debut on 2 June 2021 in the 2022 FIFA World Cup qualification game against Cayman Islands.

References

External links
 

1998 births
Living people
Footballers from Zaanstad
Aruban footballers
Aruba international footballers
Dutch footballers
Dutch people of Aruban descent
Association football defenders
FC Volendam players
SC Telstar players
OFC Oostzaan players
Eerste Divisie players
Derde Divisie players